Ben Jones-Bishop (born 24 August 1988) is a Jamaica international rugby league footballer who plays as a er or  for the Sheffield Eagles in the RFL Championship.

He played for the Leeds Rhinos in the Super League, and on loan from Leeds at Harlequins RL in the top flight. Jones-Bishop has also played for the Salford Red Devils and Wakefield Trinity in the Super League, and has played for the England Knights at international level.

Background
Jones-Bishop was born in Leeds, West Yorkshire, England. He is of Jamaican descent.

Playing career

Leeds
After impressing for the club's academy team, he made his début for the Leeds club in April 2008, in the victory over the Crusaders in the Rugby League Challenge Cup. He was awarded the Man of the Match for his performance. He went on to make a further three appearances before going on loan to Harlequins for the 2010 season.

Jones-Bishop impressed during his season at Harlequins, scoring 11 tries in 18 games, before returning to the Leeds side for the 2011 season. Jones-Bishop scored a hat trick in Leeds' 32-28 Millennium Magic, scoring a penalty try, after being brought down off the ball by Gareth Raynor to give Leeds the win. He also won the man of the match award.

Jones-Bishop played on the wing and scored a try for Leeds in the 2011 Challenge Cup Final defeat by Wigan at Wembley Stadium.

He finished off Super League XVI by playing on the wing in Leeds' 32-16 2011 Super League Grand Final victory over St Helens at Old Trafford in Manchester.

He then was a late replacement on the wing for Leeds 26-12 victory in the 2012 World Club Challenge win over National Rugby League premiers Manly at Headingley, scoring the winning try in the 76th minute off after good work by Rob Burrow, and a Kallum Watkins pass that pushed Leeds' lead out to an unbeatable 20-12.

He played in the 2012 Challenge Cup Final defeat by Warrington at Wembley Stadium.
He played in the 2012 Super League Grand Final victory over Warrington at Old Trafford.

Salford
On 10 May 2014, Jones-Bishop announced he'd leave the Leeds club at the end of the season after rejecting a new deal to remain at the club. It was believed he was unhappy with the amount of playing time he had at the club. It was announced that he would join Salford for the 2015 season. He played 25 games for Salford in 2015 scoring 15 tries.

Wakefield Trinity
On 5 November 2015 it was announced that he would be joining Wakefield Trinity on a one-year deal in 2016.

York City Knights
On 26 January 2021 it was reported that he had signed for York City in the RFL Championship.

Sheffield Eagles
On 17 November 2021 it was reported that he had signed for Sheffield in the RFL Championship.

International career
In the second match of Jamaica's 2021 Rugby League World Cup campaign, Jones-Bishop scored Jamaica's first ever try at the tournament during their 68-6 loss to New Zealand at the MKM Stadium.

References

External links

Wakefield Trinity profile
Harlequins Rugby League profile
(archived by web.archive.org) Leeds Rhinos profile
SL profile
Jamaica profile

1988 births
Living people
England Knights national rugby league team players
English people of Jamaican descent
English rugby league players
Jamaica national rugby league team players
Leeds Rhinos players
London Broncos players
Rugby league fullbacks
Rugby league players from Leeds
Rugby league wingers
Salford Red Devils players
Sheffield Eagles players
Wakefield Trinity players
York City Knights players